Triepeolus donatus is a species of cuckoo bee in the family Apidae.  It is found in North America.

References

Further reading

 
 
 

Nomadinae